The Renfe Class 446 is a series of electric multiple units designed to provide effective commuter services in major urban centers in Spain.

History 
Planning began in the early 1980s and resulted in the prototype Class 445 when commuter services began to assume a major role in cities such as Madrid. The trains then operating these services, mainly Class 440 units, were becoming inadequate to cope with the volume of traffic. It was decided that to provide the required facilities for these service, with their short inter-station distances and high passenger volume, new trains would be needed, with greater acceleration at the cost of maximum speed. Due to the 2004 Madrid train bombings, three trains of this class were decommissioned. Two of the damaged sets were amalgamated to form a new train and the third set was repaired and returned to service.

Design 
Introduced in 1989, the 446 series was an innovative train design by Renfe. The three car sets consist of two driving motor cars and an intermediate trailer, a new concept for Renfe. Each car has three pairs of double doors for quick entry and exit of travelers. One of the major drawbacks of these units, which earned them the nickname dodotis (a type of baby's nappy), is that originally they did not have toilets in the cars.

Outwardly they are of similar appearance to the later Renfe Class 447 design, with which they can operate with some limitations in traction and brake.  Recent changes and enhancements included the addition of hustle alarms, both sound and indicator lights, for closing doors. Of the 170 units delivered, 25 have been withdrawn, including those affected by the 2004 Madrid train bombings. The  units can be found operating metro type inner suburban services around Madrid, Seville, San Sebastián, Santander and Bilbao where the distances between stations is often  or even less.

Formation 
Each set is made of 3 cars:

Numbering example 
 The set no.1 is numbered as 001M-001R-002M (UIC numbering: 9-446-001+7-446-001+9-446-002), the second as 003M-002R-004M (9-446-003+7-446-002+9-446-004), and so on (M means powered and R trailer).

References

Renfe rolling stock
CAF multiple units
3000 V DC multiple units